Hartleyvale Stadium is a field hockey stadium in Observatory, Cape Town, South Africa. It was previously used as a soccer stadium by Cape Town City  in the National Football League era, as well as by Hellenic during the late 1980s. It is currently a hockey stadium, with smaller fields nearby still used for soccer by local amateur club sides.

In 1996 the Hartleyvale Stadium was upgraded at a cost of 20 million rand. The designed was by ACG Architects in association with GAPP Architects as a regional and national sporting facility to boost South Africa’s bid to host the 2004 Olympics. The complex was awarded the SAIA Award of Merit in 1996 and the SAIA Award of Excellence in 2008. The facility is now run by the City of Cape Town and has an offering two astroturf sports fields and seating for 1 700 people in the hockey section. The stadium is also used as a voting station for the South African municipal elections and the South African general elections.

The Cape Town City F.C. plays its training centre, the club's original home ground between 1962-77.

Major Events 
In 2022, the centre will host the Masters Hockey World Cups.

References

Sports venues in Cape Town
Field hockey venues in South Africa
Soccer venues in South Africa

Observatory, Cape Town